Ryedale is a non-metropolitan district in North Yorkshire, England. It is in the Vale of Pickering, a low-lying flat area of land drained by the River Derwent. The Vale's landscape is rural with scattered villages and towns. It has been inhabited continuously from the Mesolithic period. The economy is largely agricultural with light industry and tourism playing an increasing role.

Towns include Helmsley, Kirkbymoorside, Malton, Norton-on-Derwent, and Pickering. Part of Ryedale lies within the North York Moors National Park. The A64 passes through Ryedale and villages such as Rillington. In the 2011 Census, the population of this primarily rural area of 150,659 hectares, the largest district in North Yorkshire, was 51,700.

Derivation of name
The name refers to the River Rye and was previously used for the Ryedale wapentake of Yorkshire, which covered roughly the same area. The current district was formed on 1 April 1974, under the Local Government Act 1972, and was a merger of urban district of Norton and Norton Rural District, from the historic East Riding of Yorkshire, along with the urban districts of Malton and Pickering with Flaxton Rural District, Helmsley Rural District, Kirkbymoorside Rural District, Malton Rural District and Pickering Rural District, all from the North Riding of Yorkshire.

History

In the Middle Ages, there were markets in several Ryedale villages, Malton, Pickering, Kirkbymoorside, and Helmsley. A monastery was built at Lastingham in 654. Over the centuries, Celts, Romans and Anglo Saxons all inhabited the area around Pickering. The district had many ancient Saxon churches and some can still be visited, including St Peter's in Scrayingham, St Martin's in Wharram Percy, St Martins in Bulmer, St Helens in Amotherby, All Saints in Appleton-le-Street, St Peter and St Paul's Church, Pickering, All Saints in Hovingham, Holy Trinity in Stonegrave, St Gregory's Minster, Kirkdale built around 1055-1065, All Saints in Sinnington and St Andrews in Ailsby/Middleton. The Kirkdale sundial above St Gregory's door dates to the 11th century (c. 1055 to 1065).

Several abbeys and priories were also built in the 12th century, including Kirkham Priory, the very large Byland Abbey, Ampleforth Abbey, now the site of the Catholic Ampleforth College, and the finest ruined abbey in Yorkshire Rievaulx Abbey near Helmsley; it was seized in 1538 during the dissolution of the monasteries. All can be seen but all except Ampleforth are ruins.

Ryedale has two impressive castles, both now ruins. The traditional style Pickering Castle was a royal hunting lodge with a moat while Helmsley Castle was a fine medieval structure with double earthworks. The latter was extensively damaged during the Civil War, in 1644.

Council

(*2023 composed of 5 "Independent Group", 2 "Ryedale First Independents", 3 "Independents for Ryedale" and 2 "Non-Aligned Independents" and 1 "Independent aligned with Liberal Democrats".)

Since the 2015 one Conservative seat was lost to the Liberal Party in a by-election. Seven former Conservative councillors have also joined the Independent bloc.

The Conservatives are nonetheless the largest political party bloc on the council. The district is a stronghold for the Liberal Party who are the second largest political party bloc on the council.

The Ryedale First Independent Group was launched in 2019 by six former Conservative district councillors and one Conservative district councillor who failed to gain re-approval to stand for the party.

Abolition 
In July 2021 the Ministry of Housing, Communities and Local Government announced that in April 2023, the non-metropolitan county will be reorganised into a unitary authority.  Ryedale District Council will be abolished and its functions transferred to a new single authority for the non-metropolitan county of North Yorkshire.

York Unitary Authority
The district lost about half its population in 1996, when an expanded City of York became a unitary authority, specifically the parishes of Clifton Without, Earswick, Haxby, Heworth Without, Holtby, Huntington, Murton, New Earswick, Osbaldwick, Rawcliffe, Skelton, Stockton-on-the-Forest, Strensall, Towthorpe, and Wigginton.  According to the 2001 census, these parishes combined had a population of 50,163, compared to the population of the rump Ryedale district of 50,872.

Economy

The market towns of Helmsley, Kirkbymoorside, Pickering and Malton are the largest centres of population in the Ryedale District with about half of the population living there. The eastern part of the area is dominated by the influence of Scarborough. 
Each of the market towns within the Ryedale District has areas set aside for industrial use and small firms engaged in light industry and the service industries occupy these. The largest employer in the district is the pork processor Karro Food Group (once known as The Malton Bacon Factory), now employing around 1,100 people in this location.

The village of Sherburn in eastern Ryedale is home to factories of both Severfield and the Kingspan Group who purchased the local Ward Brothers steelworks business. The Kingspan factory also hosts a 5 MW solar array, one of the largest commercial rooftop solar projects in the UK.

Since 1981 the district has hosted the Ryedale Festival, which features concerts and performances at various venues during the summer months.

Notable residents
 One Night Only, Indie-pop band
 Richard Buck, athlete
 Francis Jackson, organist and composer
 James Martin, chef and television personality
 James Norton, actor
 Selina Scott, television presenter
 Ryan Swain, television and radio presenter, skateboarder

Demographics
For all districts in the Yorkshire and the Humber region, Ryedale has the lowest rate of teenage pregnancy.

References

External links

   Ryedale – Home of Kirkbymoorside Town Brass Band
 Ryedale.co.uk    Promoting Ryedale
 Ryedale District Council YouTube channel
 Visit Ryedale – Official Tourist Information for Ryedale, North Yorkshire

 
Districts of England established in 1974
Non-metropolitan districts of North Yorkshire